The Community Newspaper Group was a community newspaper business in Perth, Western Australia. Owned by Seven West Media, it published 23 community newspapers within the metropolitan region of Perth, from Yanchep and Two Rocks in the city's north to Mandurah in the south.

History
The Community Newspaper Group was established in 1985. In May 2019, Seven West Media bought out joint venture partner News Corp Australia giving it 100% ownership with its headquarters moving from Northbridge to Osborne Park.

In August 2021 Seven West Media ceased publishing most of its Community Newspaper Group-branded newspapers and replaces them with 10 localised editions under the PerthNow brand.

Publications
The Community Newspaper Group's papers included:

City and western suburbs 
 Eastern Reporter
 Guardian Express
 Stirling Times
 Western Suburbs Weekly

Hills and eastern suburbs 
 Avon Valley Gazette
 Comment News
 Hills Gazette
 Kalamunda Reporter
 Midland Reporter
 The Advocate

Northern suburbs 
 Joondalup Times
 North Coast Times
 Wanneroo Times
 Weekender

Southern suburbs 
 Canning Times
 Cockburn Gazette
 Fremantle Gazette
 Melville Times
 Southern Gazette

South coastal suburbs 
 Kwinana Courier
 Pinjarra Murray Times
 Weekend Courier

The Mandurah Coastal Times and the Sound Telegraph, covering Rockingham and the Peel region respectively, continue to be published under those names without the PerthNow branding.

Digital editions
In 2018 the Community Newspaper Group closed a number of newspapers and shifted their publication online. These digital mastheads were made available on communitynews.com.au and included:
 Comment News
 Guardian Express
 Ellenbrook/Swan Valley Advocate
 Hills/Avon Valley Gazette
 Midland/Kalamunda Reporter
 North Coast Times
 Weekend/Kwinana Courier

In April 2020 Community Newspaper Group transferred all its newspaper websites to the PerthNow website.

References

Further reading
 (2001) Community Newspapers ride high on PANPA success. (Executives at Community Newspaper Group give reasons for the company's success, after one of its free newspapers, Weekend Courier Community was voted the best free non-daily newspaper for the Australian and Pacific Region). Campaign brief (1999), Oct. 2001, p. 20-21

External links
http://www.communitynews.com.au

Companies based in Perth, Western Australia
Newspaper companies of Australia
Publishing companies established in 1985
Publishing companies disestablished in 2021
1985 establishments in Australia
2021 disestablishments in Australia